The 2008 Asian Women's Volleyball Cup, so-called 2008 AVC Cup for Women was the inaugural edition of the Asian Cup, a biennial international volleyball tournament organised by the Asian Volleyball Confederation (AVC) with Thailand Volleyball Association (TVA).The tournament was held in MCC Hall Convention Center The Mall  Nakhon Ratchasima Shopping Mall, Thailand from 1 to 7 October. 

The top 2 teams qualified for the 2009 FIVB World Grand Prix.

Pools composition
The teams are seeded based on their final ranking at the 2007 Asian Women's Volleyball Championship.

Squads

Preliminary round

Pool A

|}

|}

Pool B

|}

|}

Final round

Quarterfinals

|}

5th–8th semifinals

|}

Semifinals

|}

7th place

|}

5th place

|}

3rd place

|}

Final

|}

Final standing

Awards
MVP:  Wei Qiuyue
Best Scorer:  Kim Min-ji
Best Spiker:  Wang Yimei
Best Blocker:  Xue Ming
Best Server:  Nanami Inoue
Best Setter:  Lee Sook-ja
Best Libero:  Wanna Buakaew

See also
2008 Asian Men's Volleyball Cup

External links
Official Website of the 2008 Asian Women's Cup Volleyball Championship
Thailand volleyball federation

Asian Women's Volleyball Cup
Asian Cup
V
V